North East Medical College (NEMC) is a private medical school in Bangladesh, established in 1998. It is located in South Surma Upazila, on the southern fringes of Sylhet. It is one of the best private medical colleges and hospital in Sylhet and one of the leading medical colleges in Bangladesh. It is affiliated with Shahjalal University of Science and Technology (SUST) under the School of Medical Sciences and Sylhet Medical University (SMU).

It offers a five-year course of study leading to a Bachelor of Medicine, Bachelor of Surgery (MBBS) degree. A one-year internship after graduation is compulsory for all graduates. The degree is recognized by the Bangladesh Medical and Dental Council.

Campus
The main buildings on campus are an academic building and North East Medical College Hospital, the college's 800-bed teaching hospital.

North East Nursing College shares the campus. It offers a three-year Diploma in Nursing Science and Midwifery, a four-year Basic Bachelor of Science in Nursing, and a two-year Post-basic BSc in Nursing.

History 
North East Medical College was founded in 1998 by Northeast Medical Private Limited.

Shortly after its foundation, the Northeast Medical Private Limited acquired six acres of land in South Surma region of Sylhet. Here, in 1999 they built the medical college campus and in 2002 an 800 bed multi-specialty hospital.

After that this institute grown exponentially with development of several institute in and around the campus. Most notable of them would be the Northeast Cancer Hospital, North East Nursing College and North East Medical College Dental Unit.

Organization and administration
The college is affiliated with Shahjalal University of Science and Technology (SUST) under the School of Medical Sciences. The chairman of the Governing Body is Professor Farid Uddin Ahmed and Professor Dr Murshed Ahmed Chowdhury. The principal is Prof. Dr. Shahriar Hussain Chowdhury.

Academics
The college offers a five-year course of study, approved by the Bangladesh Medical and Dental Council (BMDC), leading to a Bachelor of Medicine, Bachelor of Surgery (MBBS) degree from SUST. After passing the final professional examination, there is a compulsory one-year internship. The internship is a prerequisite for obtaining registration from the BMDC to practice medicine. The academic calendar runs from July through June.

Admission for Bangladeshis to the MBBS programme at all medical colleges in Bangladesh (government and private) is conducted centrally by the Directorate General of Health Services (DGHS). It administers a written multiple choice question exam simultaneously throughout the country. Candidates are admitted based primarily on their score on this test, although grades at Secondary School Certificate (SSC) and Higher Secondary School Certificate (HSC) level also play a part. Admission for foreign students is based on their SSC and HSC grades. As of July 2014, the college is allowed to admit 120 students annually.

Since 2004, the college also offers postgraduate training recognized by the Bangladesh College of Physicians and Surgeons (BCPS).

Recognition and accreditation 

 European Medical Association (EMA), UK
 Higher Learning Accreditation Consultation & Training (HLACT), UK
 General Medical Council (GMC), UK
 International Accreditation Organization (IAO)
 Foundation for Advancement of International Medical Education and Research (FAIMER)
 world directory of Medical School under World Health Organization (WHO)
 Bangladesh College of Physicians & Surgeons (BCPS)
 Bangladesh Medical & Dental Council (BM&DC), Bangladesh.

COVID-19 response 
North East Medical College and Hospital became the first medical college hospital in greater Sylhet to open a fully dedicated COVID-19 unit with ICU support.

See also
 List of medical colleges in Bangladesh

References

External links
 

Medical colleges in Bangladesh
Education in Sylhet District
Hospitals in Bangladesh
Educational institutions established in 1998
1998 establishments in Bangladesh
Dakshin Surma Upazila